Amaro da Silveira (born 11 October 1901, date of death unknown), known as just Amaro, was a Brazilian footballer. He played in six matches for the Brazil national football team in 1923. He was also part of Brazil's squad for the 1923 South American Championship.

References

1901 births
Year of death missing
Brazilian footballers
Brazil international footballers
Place of birth missing
Association footballers not categorized by position